Leo Albert Jozef "Lei" Clijsters (6 November 1956 – 4 January 2009) was a Belgian professional footballer who played as a centre-back.

Throughout his extensive senior career, the tough stopper was mainly associated with KV Mechelen, with whom he won the UEFA Cup Winners' Cup and the UEFA Super Cup. Also a prominent member of the Belgium national team, he was the father of tennis players Kim and Elke Clijsters.

Club career
Lei Clijsters was born on 6 November 1956 in Opitter, started his football career with local Opitter FC. Later, he played for Club Brugge KV, but left the club after a disappointing two-year stint; he started his career as a midfielder.

Subsequently, Clijsters represented K.S.K. Tongeren, K. Patro Maasmechelen, K. Waterschei S.V. Thor Genk, KV Mechelen and R.F.C. de Liège. With Mechelen, he won the Belgian Cup in 1987, going on to conquer the subsequent UEFA Cup Winners' Cup and European Super Cup. He added the Belgian League in 1988–89, always as club captain.

In 1988, Clijsters also won the Golden Shoe award as league's MVP, and eventually retired with Liège at almost 37. Immediately, he starting working as a manager with former club Patro Eisden, then moving to K.A.A. Gent, K.F.C. Lommel S.K. (July–December 1998), K. Tesamen Hogerop Diest (two spells, in 1999–2000 and November 2000 – June 2001) and Mechelen (July–November 2000).

Clijsters was endorsed by Diadora.

Afterwards, Clijsters managed the professional tennis career of his daughter Kim. After her retirement, "Lei" became coach of third division club Tongeren, with which he had also played, in October 2007. He resigned in January 2008, after his family announced that he was suffering from a serious illness. Details were kept secret, but in February the Belgian press reported it to be metastatic melanoma and that treatment was not working.

International career
Clijsters played in 40 international matches for the Belgium national team, participating at UEFA Euro 1984 and the 1986 and 1990 FIFA World Cups.

In the 1986 edition, as Belgium reached the last four, he only appeared in two matches (being used as a substitute in the 2–1 win over Iraq and the famous round of 16 4–3 victory over the USSR.

In 1990, Clijsters saw action against South Korea (2–0 win), Uruguay (in which he scored a header in a 3–1 triumph) and England (1–0 loss after extra time).

Personal life
Clijsters was married to Els Vandecaetsbeek from 1982 until 2005.

Death
On 4 January 2009, Leo Clijsters succumbed to an illness at age 52. Upon his death, Belgian newspapers like Het Laatste Nieuws revealed that he suffered from a recurrence of melanoma which had spread to the lungs and other organs, having already experienced a bout of this condition twenty-five years earlier.

Honours

Player 
KV Mechelen Belgian First Division: 1988–89
 Belgian Cup: 1986–87; runner-up 1990–91, 1991–92
 European Cup Winners Cup: 1987–88
 European Super Cup: 1988
 Amsterdam Tournament: 1989
Joan Gamper Trophy: 1989
 Jules Pappaert Cup: 1990

Belgium
 FIFA World Cup: fourth place 1986

Individual
 Belgian Golden Shoe: 1988 
Platina Eleven (Best Team in 50 Years of Golden Shoe Winners) (2003)

References

External links

Club Brugge archives 

1956 births
2009 deaths
People from Bree, Belgium
Belgian footballers
Footballers from Limburg (Belgium)
Association football defenders
Belgian Pro League players
K. Patro Eisden Maasmechelen players
K. Waterschei S.V. Thor Genk players
Club Brugge KV players
K.V. Mechelen players
RFC Liège players
Belgium international footballers
UEFA Euro 1984 players
1986 FIFA World Cup players
1990 FIFA World Cup players
Belgian football managers
K. Patro Eisden Maasmechelen managers
K.A.A. Gent managers
Deaths from cancer in Belgium
Deaths from lung cancer
K.V. Mechelen managers
K.F.C. Diest managers
K.S.K. Tongeren players